John L. Ewy (born May 28, 1949) is an American politician. He has served as a Republican member for the 117th district in the Kansas House of Representatives since 2013.

References

1949 births
Living people
People from Hodgeman County, Kansas
Republican Party members of the Kansas House of Representatives
21st-century American politicians
Fort Hays State University alumni
Kansas State University alumni